Jordy Peffer (born 4 November 1996) is a Belgian footballer who currently plays for Lyra-Lierse.

Career

Mechelen
Peffer started his senior career with KV Mechelen in the Belgian First Division A. He made his competitive debut for the club on 4 March 2017 in a 3-2 home victory over R.S.C. Anderlecht, coming on as a 76th minute substitute for Christian Osaguona. He scored his first competitive goal for the club on 16 May 2017 in a home 1-0 victory in the Belgian Europa League playoffs against Royale Union Saint-Gilloise. His goal, scored in the 37th minute, was the only goal of the game. In a 4-2 friendly against Luxembourg, Peffer came on as a substitute and scored a goal. In June 2017, Peffer signed a two-year contract extension with the club.

Westerlo (loan)
In June 2017, Peffer was loaned out to Belgian First Division B club K.V.C. Westerlo. He made his competitive debut for the club on 11 November 2017 in a 1-0 home defeat to Royale Union Saint-Gilloise, coming on as an 82nd minute substitute for Daan Heymans.

Dessel Sport (loan)
In August 2018, Peffer was loaned out to Belgian First Amateur Division club Dessel. He made his competitive debut for the club on 24 August 2018 in a 3-1 home victory over Oud-Heverlee Leuven in the Belgian Cup, coming on as a substitute for Kevin Janssens in the 86th minute.

Lyra-Lierse
On 1 February 2019, Peffer was loaned out to Lyra-Lierse for the rest of the season. The club then announced on 10 May 2019, that they had signed the player permanently and signed a two-year contract with him from the upcoming season.

References

External links

Living people
1996 births
K.V. Mechelen players
K.V.C. Westerlo players
K.F.C. Dessel Sport players
Belgian footballers
Association football forwards
Belgian Pro League players
Challenger Pro League players
Belgian Third Division players